Zenonas is a Lithuanian masculine given name. Individuals with the name Zenonas include:
Zenonas Ivinskis (1908–1971),  Lithuanian historian
Zenonas Juknevičius (born 1949), Lithuanian politician
Zenonas Petrauskas (1950–2009), Lithuanian lawyer and politician
Zenonas Puzinauskas (1920-1995), Lithuanian basketball player

Lithuanian masculine given names